Skanpuk is a village in the Leh district of Ladakh, India. It is located in the Nubra tehsil. It is on the way to Turtuk, Nubra.

Geography
Skanpuk is in the Shyok river valley, adjacent to Hundar, close to the confluence of the Nubra river with Shyok. 

Skanpuk is named after the Skanpuk peak, elevation , below which the village sits. The surveyor William Johnson is said to have used the peak as a trigonometric station during his surveys.

Demographics
According to the 2011 census of India, Skanpuk has 93 households. The effective literacy rate (i.e. the literacy rate of population excluding children aged 6 and below) is 63.32%.

Notes

References

Villages in Nubra tehsil